The 89th Operations Group (89 OG) is the operational flying component of the United States Air Force 89th Airlift Wing.   It is stationed at Andrews Air Force Base, Maryland.

The 89 OG provides Special Air Mission (SAM) transport to high U.S. government officials and foreign dignitaries as needed. The group provided SAM transport to the President of the United States until  20 February 2001 when that mission was delegated to the Presidential Airlift Group.

Its World War II predecessor unit, the 89th Troop Carrier Group was a First Air Force training unit providing transition training for pilots, 1942–1944, then briefly became a replacement training unit (RTU) during 1944 when it was inactivated.  It trained in the Air Force Reserve for troop carrier operations, June 1949-May 1951, when it was briefly called into active service in May 1951 to provide personnel to other units during the Korean War. Reactivated in 1952 and trained in the Reserve for Tactical Air Command fighter-bomber operations until being inactivated in 1957.

Historical summary of organizational changes

Lineage
 Established as 89th Transport Group on 19 January 1942
 Activated on 1 February 1942
 Redesignated 89th Troop Carrier Group on 4 July 1942
 Disestablished on 14 April 1944
 Reestablished, and redesignated 89th Troop Carrier Group, Medium, on 10 May 1949
 Activated in the Reserve on 27 June 1949
 Ordered to active service on 1 May 1951
 Inactivated on 10 May 1951
 Redesignated 89th Fighter-Bomber Group on 26 May 1952
 Activated in the Reserve on 14 June 1952
 Inactivated on 16 November 1957
 Redesignated: 89th Tactical Fighter Group on 31 July 1985 (Remained inactive)
 Redesignated: 89th Operations Group on 1 July 1991
 Activated on 12 July 1991.

Assignments
 Air Force Combat Command, 1 February 1942
 50 Transport (later, 50 Troop Carrier) Wing, 30 April 1942
 53 Troop Carrier Wing, 3 November 1942
 I Troop Carrier Command, 24 December 1942
 61 Troop Carrier Wing, 26 February-14 April 1944
 89th Troop Carrier Wing, Medium, 27 June 1949 – 10 May 1951
 89th Fighter-Bomber Wing, 14 June 1952 – 16 November 1957
 89th Airlift Wing, 12 July 1991-.

Components
 1st Airlift Squadron: 12 July 1991–present, C-32A & C-40B aircraft
 99th Airlift Squadron, C-37A & C-37B aircraft
 89th Operations Support Squadron: 12 Jul 1991-present
 1st Helicopter Squadron: 12 July 1991–2006
 24 Transport (later, 24 Troop Carrier; 24 Fighter-Bomber): 1 February 1942 – 14 April 1944; 27 June 1949 – 10 May 1951; 14 June 1952 – 16 November 1957
 25 Transport (later, 25 Troop Carrier; 25 Fighter-Bomber): 1 February 1942 – 14 April 1944; 27 June 1949 – 10 May 1951; 14 June 1952 – 1 July 1957
 26 Transport (later, 26 Troop Carrier; 26 Fighter-Bomber): 1 February 1942 – 14 April 1944; 27 June 1949 – 10 May 1951; 14 June 1952 – 16 November 1957
 27 Transport: 1 February-15 June 1942
 28 Transport: 1 February-19 May 1942
 30 Transport (later, 30 Troop Carrier): 15 June 1942 – 14 April 1944; 27 June 1949 – 10 May 1951
 31 Transport (later, 31 Troop Carrier): 15 June 1942 – 14 April 1944. 99 Airlift: 12 July 1991–present
 457th Airlift Squadron: 1 April 1993 – 1 April 1995

Stations
 Daniel Field Airport, Georgia, 1 February 1942
 Harding Army Air Field, Louisiana, 8 March 1942
 Camp Williams, Wisconsin, 20 June 1942
 Sedalia Army Air Field, Missouri, 8 September 1942
 Del Valle (later, Bergstrom) Field, Texas, 14 December 1942 – 14 April 1944
 Laurence G. Hanscom Field, Massachusetts, 27 June 1949 – 10 May 1951; 14 June 1952 – 16 November 1957
 Andrews AFB, Maryland, 12 July 1991–present

Aircraft

 DC-3 (probably as military versions C-49, C-50, and C-53), 1942–1943
 C-47, 1943–1944; TC-47, 1955-195
 C-45, 1949–1950; 1955–1957
 C-46, 1949–1951; 1952, 1956–1957
 F-51, 1952–1954
 F-80, 1953–1957
 F-86, 1957
 C-119, 1957
 C-135, 1991–1992; VC-135, 1991–1992
 VC-137 (later, C-137), 1991–2001

 VC/C-9, 1991 – 2005
 UH-1, 1991–2006
 C-12, 1991–1993
 C-20, 1991–2018
 VC-25A, 1991–Present
 C-21, 1993–1997
 C-32, 1998–present
 C-37, 1998–present
 C-40, 2002–present

Notes

References
89th Operations Group Factsheet

Attribution

External links

Military units and formations in Maryland
089
1942 establishments in the United States
1942 establishments in Georgia (U.S. state)